Central Tower is a  21-story office building at Market and Third Streets in San Francisco, California. The building has undergone numerous renovations since its completion in 1898 as the  Call Building. It was later known as the Spreckels Building.

History
In 1890, M. H. de Young, owner of the San Francisco Chronicle, built San Francisco's first skyscraper, the  Chronicle Building, to house his newspaper.  In response, John D. Spreckels and his father Claus Spreckels purchased the San Francisco Call in 1895 and commissioned a tower of their own that would dwarf the Chronicle Building.  In September 1895, The Call wrote:

The building eventually stood 315 feet (96 m) tall with an ornate baroque dome—which housed the offices of Reid & Reid, the building's architects—and four corner cupolas when construction finished in 1898. It was the tallest building west of the Mississippi River for many years. The structure was badly burned and damaged by the 1906 San Francisco earthquake, although the building did not collapse.

After the fire, The Call reopened its offices at a new location, The Montgomery, and the former Call Building became known as the Spreckels Building. In 1938 Albert Roller completely refurbished Central Tower. The building's height was reduced to 298 feet (91 m) and the number of stories was increased from 15 to 21; the ornate dome and the cupolas atop the building were removed.

See also

List of early skyscrapers
List of San Francisco Designated Landmarks
List of tallest buildings in San Francisco

References

External links

 

Skyscraper office buildings in San Francisco
Financial District, San Francisco
Market Street (San Francisco)
Office buildings completed in 1898
1898 establishments in California
Reid & Reid buildings
Art Deco architecture in California